Vitor Gonçalves (born Almada, 1963) is a Portuguese theatre director.

Early life

Vitor Gonçalves, born in 1963 in Almada, has a degree in history from the Universidade Autónoma – Luís de Camões, Lisbon, 1987. In 1981, he joined an acting course in the actors' school Grupo de Campolide (Campolide Group).

Productions

1981 - Joins Companhia de Teatro de Almada (Theatre Company of Almada) (CTA),  Grupo de Campolide (Campolide Group).
1981/1994 – Is protagonist in texts from: António José da Silva, Almeida Garrett, Virgílio Martinho, Fonseca Lobo, Molière and participates in shows of authors such as: Gil Vicente, Gogol, Camus, Brecht, Eugene O’ Neill, among others.
1994/2006 – In CTA, Almada directs:
A Farsa de Mestre Phatelin (Master Phatelin farce) anonymous author sec. XV
Auto da Índia (Act of India) and other texts from Gil Vicente
Noivado no Dafundo (Dafundo wedding) and other texts by Almeida Garrett
De graus (Steps) by Prista Monteiro
Sobre os Rios de Babilónia (On the rivers of Babylon)by A. Borges Coelho
A Paz (Peace) from Aristofanes
Texts from G.Feydeau
O Casamento da Condessa de Amieira (Amieira Countess wedding), Júlio Dinis
O Colar de Helena (Helena's necklace), Carole Fréchette.
Works with: António Assunção. Cecília Guimarães, Manuela Cassola, Teresa Gafeira, Luís Vicente, Francisco Costa, Maria Frade, Joana Fartaria, among others.
Sets and decors from well known Vasco Eloy, José Manuel Castanheira and Maria João Silveira Ramos.
1985/2006 – Works with Joaquim Benite as his directing assistant CTA on several productions:
Molière, Shakespeare, S. Beckett, J. Saramago, E. Albee, M. Duras, M. Bulgakov, A. Pushkin, A. Adamavo, T. Bernhard, P. Shaffer, G.Lorca, A.Skármeta, V. Haim, J.S.Sinisterra, N. Dear, D. Besse, among others.
For more than 20 years directs, with Joaquim Benite, both the Companhia de Teatro de Almada (Almada Theatre Company) and Festival Internacional de Teatro de Almada (International Theatre Festival of Almada).

References

External links 
Ctalamda

Living people
1963 births
People from Almada
Portuguese theatre directors

pt:Vítor Gonçalves